Hermann Billing (February 7, 1867, Karlsruhe – March 2, 1946, Karlsruhe) was a German Art Nouveau architect and designer.

He attended high school, Kunstgewerbeschule and architectural college, but completed none of them.
Funded by his wealthy first wife, he started his work by taking part in competitions. He gained reputation for his avantgarde ideas and subsequently contracts for public buildings. After 1920, he was professor at the Academy of Fine Arts, Karlsruhe and the University of Technology.

20th-century German architects
1867 births
1946 deaths
Art Nouveau architects
Architects from Karlsruhe
Academic staff of the Academy of Fine Arts, Karlsruhe